The Cananefates, or Canninefates, Caninefates, or Canenefatae,  meaning "leek masters", were a Germanic tribe, who lived in the Rhine delta, in western Batavia (later Betuwe), in the Roman province of Germania Inferior (now in the Dutch province of South Holland), before and during the Roman conquest.

Apparently, the name had its origins in the Cananefates living on sandy soils that were considered excellent for growing Alliums such as leeks and onions.

At the beginning of the Batavian rebellion under Gaius Julius Civilis in the year 69, the Batavians sent envoys to the Canninefates to urge a common policy. "This is a tribe," says Tacitus (Histories Book iv) "which inhabits part of the island, and closely resembles the Batavians in their origins, languages, and in their courageous character, but is inferior in numbers." This would imply a similar descent as the Batavians from the Chatti. In the failed uprising that followed, the Canninefates were led by their chieftain Brinno, the son of a chief who had faced down Caligula.
The capital of the civitas of the Cananefates was Forum Hadriani, modern Voorburg.

In modern times, the region Kennemerland is said to derive from the name of the Cananefates.

See also
List of Germanic peoples

Notes

Early Germanic peoples
History of South Holland
Netherlands in the Roman era